Donbaleh Rud-e Shomali Rural District is a rural district (dehestan) in Dehdez District, Izeh County, Khuzestan Province, Iran. At the 2006 census, its population was 5,360, in 1,000 families.  The rural district has 52 villages.

References 

Rural Districts of Khuzestan Province
Izeh County